Beydinga (Beydiŋe) is a rural locality (a selo), the administrative centre of and one of two settlements, in addition to  Arylakh, in Oltyokhsky Rural Okrug of Ust-Aldansky District in the Sakha Republic, Russia. Its population as of the 2002 Census was 632.

References

Notes

Sources
Official website of the Sakha Republic. Registry of the Administrative-Territorial Divisions of the Sakha Republic. Ust-Aldansky District. 

Rural localities in Ust-Aldansky District